Baniyas Stadium is a stadium in the Bani Yas area of Abu Dhabi, United Arab Emirates.

It is the home stadium of Baniyas SC of the UAE Pro-League. The stadium holds 9,570 spectators.

External links

 StadiumDB images

References

Baniyas SC
Football venues in the United Arab Emirates